Pogonus is a genus of ground beetles in the family Carabidae, found worldwide. There are more than 50 described species in Pogonus.

Species
These 57 species belong to the genus Pogonus:

 Pogonus andrewesi Lutshnik, 1934  (Mongolia)
 Pogonus apicalis Erichson, 1843  (Angola and Namibia)
 Pogonus approximans Fairmaire, 1888  (China)
 Pogonus australis Chaudoir, 1878  (Australia)
 Pogonus biroi Csiki, 1907  (India and Iraq)
 Pogonus bulgani Jedlicka, 1968  (Mongolia)
 Pogonus cardiotrachelus Chaudoir, 1872  (Australia)
 Pogonus castaneipes Fairmaire, 1888  (China)
 Pogonus chalceus (Marsham, 1802)  (Europe, North Africa)
 Pogonus cumanus Lutshnik, 1916  (Palearctic)
 Pogonus dichrous Baehr, 2010  (Australia)
 Pogonus diplochaetoides Baehr, 1997  (Australia)
 Pogonus dostali Baehr, 2010  (Australia)
 Pogonus fasciatopunctatus A.Morawitz, 1862  (Russia)
 Pogonus fennelli Hudson, 2000  (Australia)
 Pogonus formosanus Jedlicka, 1956  (Taiwan and temperate Asia)
 Pogonus gilesi B.Moore, 1977  (Australia)
 Pogonus gilvipes Dejean, 1828  (Europe, Asia, Africa)
 Pogonus grossi B.Moore, 1977  (Australia)
 Pogonus hormozganicus Azadbakhsh, 2019  (Iran)
 Pogonus hypharpagioides Sloane, 1895  (Australia)
 Pogonus iridipennis Nicolai, 1822  (Europe, Asia)
 Pogonus itoshimaensis Habu, 1954  (Japan, Russia, South Korea)
 Pogonus japonicus Putzeys, 1875  (Japan and South Korea)
 Pogonus lamprus Wiedemann, 1823  (South Africa)
 Pogonus littoralis (Duftschmid, 1812)  (Europe)
 Pogonus luridipennis (Germar, 1822) (Yellow Pogonus)  (Europe, North Africa)
 Pogonus lutshniki Kryzhanovskij, 1990  (Turkmenistan)
 Pogonus matthewsi Baehr & Hudson, 2001  (Australia)
 Pogonus meridionalis Dejean, 1828  (Europe, western Asia)
 Pogonus micans Chaudoir, 1842  (southwest Asia)
 Pogonus minutus Dejean, 1828  (South Africa and Senegal/Gambia)
 Pogonus nigrescens Baehr, 1984  (Australia)
 Pogonus olivaceus Carret, 1903  (Bulgaria and Greece)
 Pogonus ordossicus Semenov, 1889  (China and Mongolia)
 Pogonus orientalis Dejean, 1828  (Palearctic)
 Pogonus pallidipennis Dejean, 1828  (France, Italy, and Spain)
 Pogonus peisonis Ganglbauer, 1891  (Europe)
 Pogonus perovalis Baehr & Hudson, 2001  (Australia)
 Pogonus pueli Lutshnik, 1935  (China)
 Pogonus punctifrons Reitter, 1908  (Cyprus, Israel, Turkey)
 Pogonus punctulatus Dejean, 1828  (Europe, Asia)
 Pogonus reticulatus Schaum, 1857  (Greece, Moldova, Ukraine)
 Pogonus riparius Dejean, 1828  (Europe)
 Pogonus rodolphi Alluaud, 1939  (Kenya)
 Pogonus saskiae Baehr, 1997  (Australia)
 Pogonus sauteri Jedlicka, 1956  (Taiwan and temperate Asia)
 Pogonus smaragdinus Waltl, 1835  (Morocco and Spain)
 Pogonus submarginatus Reitter, 1908  (Asia)
 Pogonus sumlini Baehr, 1999  (Australia)
 Pogonus syriacus Chaudoir, 1872  (Cyprus, Syria, and Turkey)
 Pogonus texanus Chaudoir, 1868  (North America)
 Pogonus transfuga Chaudoir, 1872  (Palearctic)
 Pogonus turkestanicus Lutshnik, 1935  (Kazakhstan)
 Pogonus variabilis B.Moore, 1991  (Australia)
 Pogonus vicinus Baehr & Hudson, 2001  (Australia)
 Pogonus zietzi Sloane, 1895  (Australia)

References

External links

 

Trechinae